Cyril Leonard Shaps (13 October 1923 – 1 January 2003) was an English actor of radio, television and film, with a career spanning over seven decades.

Early radio
Shaps was born in the East End of London to Polish-Jewish parents; his father was a tailor. Shaps was a child broadcaster, at the London School of Broadcasting providing voices for radio commercials from the age of 12. He was educated at Central Foundation Boys' School, then took an office job with the London Ambulance Service. Following service as a warrant officer in the Royal Army Educational Corps during World War II, he was trained at the Royal Academy of Dramatic Art (RADA) and then worked for two years as an announcer, producer and scriptwriter for Radio Netherlands. His short stature and round face then led to a steady flow of character roles in film and television in a career spanning nearly 50 years.

Film
Shaps's film appearances included bit parts in Lawrence of Arabia (1962), as the officer's club bartender, To Sir, with Love (1967), as Mr Pinkus, and the James Bond film The Spy Who Loved Me (1977), as Dr Bechmann. In The Madness of King George (1994), he portrayed Dr Pepys, a royal physician obsessed with the colour of the king's stool. In 2002, at the age of 78, Shaps performed his last film roles: as a pew opener in The Importance of Being Earnest, and as concentration camp victim Mr. Grun in The Pianist.

Television
In TV, his work ranged from science fiction (including appearances in the Doctor Who serials The Tomb of the Cybermen, The Ambassadors of Death, Planet of the Spiders and The Androids of Tara), to classic literature (such as the BBC's 1990s serialisations of Charles Dickens's Martin Chuzzlewit and Our Mutual Friend) to detective series (with appearances in The Saint, Lovejoy, and Sherlock Holmes and the Leading Lady—as Emperor Franz Joseph—in 1991).  He appeared in the first episode of the sitcom The Young Ones, playing a neighbour. He appeared in two Jim Henson Company television films: Gulliver's Travels (1996) as an elderly madman, and Jack and the Beanstalk: The Real Story (2001) as the "Bent Little Man". He supplied the voice of Professor Rudolf Popkiss in the second series of Supercar, broadcast in 1962. He also voiced the characters of Mr. Gruber in The Adventures of Paddington Bear, and Great Grandfather Frost in one episode of Animated Tales of the World.

Other notable work
Other series featuring Shaps were Quatermass II, Danger Man, The Mask of Janus, The Spies, Dixon of Dock Green, Z-Cars, The Saint, Out of the Unknown, Alexander the Greatest, The Rat Catchers, Man in a Suitcase, Randall and Hopkirk, Department S, The Liver Birds, When the Boat Comes In, Some Mothers Do 'Ave 'Em, The Onedin Line, The Persuaders!, Porridge, The Sweeney, Jesus of Nazareth, Wilde Alliance, Holocaust (miniseries), Private Schulz, The Young Ones, Hammer House of Mystery and Suspense, The Bill, Dark Season, Midsomer Murders and Doctors.

Shaps' radio work included a stint with the BBC Drama Repertory Company in the early 1950s. Broadcast parts (his characters often being old men or priests) included Firs in The Cherry Orchard, Justice Shallow in Henry the Fourth, Friar Lawrence in Romeo and Juliet, Polonius in Hamlet and Canon Chasuble in The Importance of Being Earnest.

Personal life and death 
Shaps and his wife Anita were married from 1950 until her death in 2002; they had two sons, Matthew and Simon, and a daughter, Sarah.

Shaps died in Harrow, London on New Year's Day 2003, aged 79, and was survived by his children.

Selected filmography

 Interpol (1957) – Warden
 Miracle in Soho (1957) – Mr. Swoboda
 The Silent Enemy (1958) – Miguel
 Passport to Shame (1958) – Willie
 Danger Within (1959) – Lt. Cyriakos Coutoules
 SOS Pacific (1959) – Louis
 Never Let Go (1960) – Cypriot
 Follow That Horse! (1960) – Dr. Spiegel
 The Boy Who Stole a Million (1960) – Bank Clerk
 Return of a Stranger (1961) – Homer Trent
 The Terror of the Tongs (1961) – (uncredited)
 The Pursuers (1961) – Karl Luther
 Lawrence of Arabia (1962) – Bartender in Officer's Club (uncredited)
 The Small World of Sammy Lee (1963) – Maurice 'Morrie' Bellman
 The Little Ones (1965) – Child Welfare Officer
 Up Jumped a Swagman (1965) – Phil Myers
 Rasputin: the Mad Monk (1966) – Foxy Face (uncredited)
 To Sir, with Love (1967) – Mr. Pinkus (uncredited)
 The Looking Glass War (1970) – East German Detective
 The Kremlin Letter (1970) – Police Doctor
 Our Miss Fred (1972) – Doctor
 QB VII (1974) – Uri Lehrer
 11 Harrowhouse (1974) – Wildenstein, the Diamond Cutter
 The Odessa File (1974) – Tauber's Voice (voice)
 The Hiding Place (1975) – Building Inspector Smit
 Operation Daybreak (1975) – Father Petrek 
 The Message (1976) – (voice)
 The Spy Who Loved Me (1977) – Dr. Bechmann
 Unidentified Flying Oddball (1979) – Dr. Zimmerman
 Avalanche Express (1979) – Sedov
 Erik the Viking (1989) – Gisli the Chiseller
 Sherlock Holmes and the Leading Lady (1991) – Emperor Franz Joseph
 The Madness of King George (1994) – Pepys
 For my Baby (1997) – Joshua Orgelbrand
 The Governess (1998) – Doctor
 Simon Magus (1999) – Chaim
 The Lost Son (1999) – Mr. Spitz
 Solomon and Gaenor (1999) – Ephraim
 The Clandestine Marriage (1999) – Canton
 The End of the Affair (1999) – Waiter
 The Man Who Cried (2000) – Older Man in Sweatshop
 The Pianist (2002) – Mr. Grün
 The Importance of Being Earnest (2002) – Pew Opener (final film role)

Doctor Who

1967 The Tomb of the Cybermen – John Viner

1970 The Ambassadors of Death – Lennox

1974 Planet of the Spiders – Professor Clegg

1978 The Androids of Tara – Archimandrite

References

External links

1923 births
2003 deaths
20th-century English male actors
21st-century English male actors
Alumni of RADA
BBC people
British Army personnel of World War II
English male film actors
English male radio actors
English male television actors
English male voice actors
English Ashkenazi Jews
English people of Polish-Jewish descent
English radio producers
English radio writers
Jewish English male actors
Male actors from London
People educated at Central Foundation Boys' School
Radio and television announcers
Royal Army Educational Corps soldiers
20th-century British businesspeople
Military personnel from London